Borrelia bissettiae (formerly B. bissettii, before renaming in 2019) is a spirochete bacterium. The type strain is strain DN127. It is pathogenic and causes Lyme borreliosis in the Americas and Eurasia.

See also 
Lyme disease microbiology

References

Further reading

External links 
NCBI Taxonomy Browser - Borrelia

Type strain of Borrelia bissettii at BacDive -  the Bacterial Diversity Metadatabase

bissettii
Bacteria described in 1998